Robert Gregory "Bob" Buzzard (born December 9, 1942 in Waterloo, Iowa) is an American former wrestler who competed at the 1972 Summer Olympics in Greco-Roman wrestling.

References

1942 births
Living people
Sportspeople from Waterloo, Iowa
Olympic wrestlers of the United States
Wrestlers at the 1972 Summer Olympics
American male sport wrestlers